Robert Lawrence Balzer (June 25, 1912 – December 2, 2011) has been called the first serious wine journalist in the United States. He was born in Des Moines, Iowa. At the age of 24, he was put in charge of the wine department of his family’s grocery/gourmet market in Los Angeles, California. Because he knew nothing about wine, he quickly educated himself on the subject. Balzer soon championed quality California wines and stocked his shelves with the best American wines available. He promoted wine in his customer newsletter and was asked by Will Rogers, Jr. to write a regular wine column in his local newspaper in 1937.

Accomplishments

In 1948, Balzer published California’s Best Wines, the  first of his eleven books. His wine writings include articles published in Travel Holiday magazine for over twenty years, a weekly wine column in the Los Angeles Times Magazine, and  Robert Lawrence Balzer’s Private Guide to Food and Wine. He also hosted a daily broadcast "A Word on Wine" on Los Angeles' classical radio station KFAC for many years. His final book Hollywood and Vine, published and available online, included vignettes of his personal relationships with Hollywood celebrities and wine luminaries.   

In the 1950s he worked for United Press in Asia, at the same time producing propaganda pieces for the US Information Service. After reporting on the coronation of Norodom Suramarit in March, 1955, his agency arranged for his widely publicized twelve day stay in the Wat Phrachumsagar (វត្តប្រជុំសាគរ). Present at his ordination was the creme of Cambodian Buddhism, his preceptor Dharmawara, who was taken to the US for the first time in 1955 by the USIA. 

Balzer was on a similar propaganda assignment in Japan late in 1959 when the AMPO riots brought relations between the countries to a new low. Here his reporting about Zen and the 101 year old abbot of Hōkō-ji (Shizuoka), Ashikaga Shizan, was to instill a positive image.

In 1973, Balzer organized the New York Wine Tasting of 1973 which was a precursor to the matching of French and Californian wine at the Judgment of Paris. He assembled fourteen leading wine experts including vigneron Alexis Lichine and accomplished wine merchant Sam Aaron.

Balzer oversaw food and wine at the presidential inaugurations of Ronald Reagan in 1981 and 1985, and for George H. W. Bush in 1989. He was friends with some of Hollywood's elite, including Cecil B. DeMille, Alfred Hitchcock, Marlon Brando, Ingrid Bergman, Olivia De Havilland, and Gloria Swanson.

Balzer died on December 2nd, 2011, in Orange, California, at the age of 99.

See also
 List of wine personalities

References

Further reading
 Taber, George M. Judgment of Paris: California vs France and the Historic 1976 Paris Tasting that Revolutionized Wine. NY: Scribner, 2005.

External links
 Wine Appreciation Guild
 Cal Poly Pomona Special Collections on Robert Lawrence Balzer

1912 births
2011 deaths
California State Polytechnic University, Pomona alumni
Wine writers
American male journalists
Writers from Des Moines, Iowa